Wang Yirong (1845–1900) was a director of the Chinese Imperial Academy, best known as the first to recognize that the symbols inscribed on oracle bones were an early form of Chinese writing. His work on the oracle bone script was curtailed when he accepted a local command during the Boxer Rebellion, despite his belief that the cause was futile.  When an international force occupied Beijing in August 1900, Wang committed suicide, together with his wife and daughter-in-law. A museum devoted to Wang is located in his birthplace of Yantai, Shandong.

References 

Qing dynasty politicians from Shandong
1845 births
1900 deaths
Qing dynasty generals
Politicians from Yantai
Suicides in the Qing dynasty
Suicides by poison
Writers from Yantai
Scientists from Shandong
Generals from Shandong
Chinese epigraphers
1900 suicides